Defending champion Johan Kriek defeated Steve Denton in a rematch of the previous year's final, 6–3, 6–3, 6–2 to win the men's singles tennis title at the 1982 Australian Open. Kriek saved a match point en route to the title, against Paul McNamee in the semifinals. The format of this year's tournament was best of 5 sets in the first two rounds, best of 3 sets in rounds 3 and 4, then best of 5 sets for the rest of the tournament.

Seeds
The seeded players are listed below. Johan Kriek is the champion; others show the round in which they were eliminated.

  Johan Kriek (champion)
  Steve Denton (final)
  Mark Edmondson (first round)
  Brian Teacher (quarterfinals)
  Tim Mayotte (third round)
  Hank Pfister (semifinals)
  John Alexander (fourth round)
  Chris Lewis (third round)
  John Sadri (fourth round)
  Tim Wilkison (third round)
  Jeff Borowiak (fourth round)
  Víctor Pecci (first round)
  Phil Dent (fourth round)
  Russell Simpson (second round)
  Fritz Buehning (first round)
  Paul McNamee (semifinals)

Qualifying

Draw

Final eight

Section 1

Section 2

Section 3

Section 4

Section 5

Section 6

Section 7

Section 8

External links
 Association of Tennis Professionals (ATP) – 1982 Australian Open Men's Singles draw
 1982 Australian Open – Men's draws and results at the International Tennis Federation

Mens singles
Australian Open (tennis) by year – Men's singles